Emmalocera celsella is a species of snout moth in the genus Emmalocera. It was described by Francis Walker in 1863 and is known from Sri Lanka.

References

Moths described in 1863
Emmalocera
Moths of Sri Lanka